Som Parkash is a politician belonging to the Bharatiya Janata Party. He is the Union Minister of State for Commerce and Industry, Government of India. He is a Member of Parliament from Hoshiarpur Lok Sabha Constituency and an Ex-MLA from Phagwara. He is also a former Deputy Commissioner of Jalandhar and former IAS officer of 1988 batch in Punjab cadre.  Som Parkash, who was born on 3 April 1949, is an MA (Economics) from the Punjab University, Chandigarh. He had started his career as a research officer in the Punjab State Planning Board in 1972. Thereafter, he became an excise and taxation officer in the Punjab Excise Department. Som Parkash has served as the deputy commissioner of Faridkot, Hoshiarpur and Jalandhar and has also held posts like the Labour Commissioner, Punjab Urban Planning and Development Authority (PUDA) chief administrator, managing director of the Punjab Financial Corporation and director of the Social Security Department.

Family
His father's name is Hazara Ram.
He has 2 sons,
Sanjeev and Dr.Sahil Kainth.

Political career
Som Parkash first unsuccessfully contested Lok Sabha during Indian general elections in 2009 from Hoshiarpur constituency. Due to corruption charges, sitting MLA from Phagwara Swarna Ram was dropped from the state cabinet, which led BJP to look for a new candidate and Som Parkash was appointed BJP candidate in 2012 Punjab elections. He successfully contested and became MLA from Phagwara. For the next term in 2017, he was again fielded to contest Punjab Vidhan Sabha elections from Phagwara and he won consecutively for the second time.  In 2019 General Elections, he was given ticket from Hoshiarpur Lok Sabha Constituency in place of Vijay Sampla and he managed to win that election.

In May 2019, Prakash became Minister of State for Commerce and Industry.

References 

Living people
People from Kapurthala district
Bharatiya Janata Party politicians from Punjab
Members of the Punjab Legislative Assembly
Punjab, India MLAs 2012–2017
Punjab, India MLAs 2017–2022
Narendra Modi ministry
1949 births